Uppur Supercritical Thermal Power Project is located in Uppur and near Tiruvadanai, Ramanathapuram District in Tamil Nadu. The power plant is one of the coal based power plants of TANGEDCO. This project is being constructed by BHEL, L&T and Reliance Infrastructure.

Construction
RIL was awarded the engineering, procurement and construction contract in the BoP package and allied civil works, BHEL was awarded the boiler, turbine and generator contract and L&T was awarded the seawater intake and outfall system contract.

Materials for erection brought to the site and foundation process under progress. Foundation for two units of plant under Bharat Heavy Electricals Limited has already been completed. ESP 1 & ESP 2 foundation completed. The project is on hold  at present.

Installed Capacity

See also

References

Coal-fired power stations in Tamil Nadu